Stigmella crataegella is a moth of the family Nepticulidae found in Europe. It was described by the Austrian entomologist Josef Wilhelm Klimesch in 1936. The larvae mine the leaves of hawthorns.

Life cycle
The wingspan is 4–5 mm. The head is black, collar white. Antennal eyecaps white. Forewings are a shining  golden brown basal to a brassy fascia. Distad beyond this is dark purple brown. Hindwings grey brown. Male has black scent scales Adults are on wing from May to early June. There is one generation per year.

Ovum
Eggs are laid on the underside of hawthorn leaves, at the base of the leaf, close to the midrib.

Larvae
Larvae feed from June to August and are bright green with a transparent green head; the mandibles are pale brown. They feed on Crataegus laciniata, woodland hawthorn (Crataegus laevigata), common hawthorn (Crataegus monogyna), small-flowered black hawthorn (Crataegus pentagyna), river hawthorn (Crataegus rivularis), littlehip hawthorn (Crataegus spathulata) and Crataemespilus grandiflora. They mine the leaves of their host plant. The mine consists of a corridor, which is similar to the mine of Stigmella perpygmaeella. The first part of the corridor is narrower and the frass is concentrated in a central line, later it is clearly coiled. The corridor makes several hairpin turns, usually resulting in a secondary blotch.

Pupa
The cocoon is reddish-brown and spun either on or below the surface.

Distribution
The moth is found from Fennoscandia to the Iberian Peninsula, Italy and Macedonia, and from Ireland to Poland and Romania.

Etymology
Stigmella crataegella was originally named Nepticula crataegella by Josef Wilhelm Klimeschin in 1936, from a specimen found in the Tyrol, Austria. Nepticula, refers to a grand daughter, the smallest member of a family (i.e. the small size of the moth), while crataegella refers to the genus of the food plant. The genus Stigmella – ″stigma″, refers to the conspicious (or occasionally metallic) small dot or a brand fascia on the forewing of many of the Stigmella species, or possibly the small size of the moths.

References

External links
 Swedish moths
 British leafminers
 UKflymines

Nepticulidae
Leaf miners
Moths described in 1936
Moths of Europe